The 2008 West Australian Football League (WAFL) Grand Final was the culmination of the 124th season of the premier Australian rules football league in Western Australia. It was played at Subiaco Oval on 20 September 2008 and was won by the Subiaco Football Club, who defeated the Swan Districts Football Club by 57 points.

Background
Subiaco had dominated the 2008 season as no team in a major Australian Rules League had since Port Adelaide in the 1914 SAFL season. After twenty home-and-away games the Lions had lost just one game by the narrowest of margins to their Grand Final rivals in mid-season, with the closest any other opponent got to them being eighteen points. The Lions were targeting their third straight WAFL flag, and their fourth in just five years, all the while finishing an unprecedented seven and a half games clear of second-placed West Perth.

Swan Districts had finished fourth at the end of the season and had beat two higher ranked opponents in South Fremantle and West Perth to get to this match.  The game showcased numerous young players who were to be drafted in the upcoming 2008 AFL Draft including Nic Naitanui, Chris Yarran, Clancee Pearce, Todd Banfield, Daniel Rich, Adam Cockie and Greg Broughton.

Teams

Subiaco

Swan Districts

Match Summary
Swans started the game in superb style, as they had the run of the game early, starting with West Coast-listed player Tony Notte kicking the first goal in the opening minute of the game. The underdogs continued to use the ball cleverly and take their chances throughout the opening quarter to open up a somewhat surprising sixteen point lead at quarter time.

In the second term the contest was much more tight and the Lions ferocity was beginning to take its toll on Swans. At half time Subiaco held a slender four point lead.

As the game progressed Swans began to break down across half forward and couldn't find their way to goal enough times to counteract a potent Lions forward set up where WAFL leading goalkicker Brad Smith kicked six goals, Mapleston four and Phil Read and Shaun Hildebrandt three each.

Subiaco then went on in almost 'cruise control' to claim the Premiership.

References

Wafl Grand Final, 2008
West Australian Football League Grand Finals